Teemu Olavi Laajasalo (born 10 July 1974) is a Finnish clergyman. He was born in Helsinki and obtained the qualification of doctor in education. He is currently the Lutheran Bishop of Helsinki. He was elected on 16 August 2017. He has previously served as the vicar of the parish of Kallio.

Helsinki police suspected Laajasalo of accounting fraud. The Helsinki District Court imposed a 20-day fine on Laajasalo for aggravated negligence accounting offences.

References 

1974 births
Living people
Lutheran bishops of Helsinki